Alain Michel may refer to:

 Alain Michel (football manager) (born 1948), French football manager
 Alain Michel (motorcyclist) (born 1953), French sidecar racer